Caren Marie Alexius Kemner (born April 16, 1965 in Quincy, Illinois) is an American volleyball player. Among her accomplishments, she won the bronze medal with the USA National Women's Team at the 1992 Summer Olympics in Barcelona, Spain, and was inducted into the international Volleyball Hall of Fame in October 2013.
Height-190
Spike-320cm
Block-295cm
Kemner played two seasons of college women's volleyball at the University of Arizona.  She currently coaches the men's and women's volleyball teams at Culver-Stockton College.

International Competitions
1985 – NORCECA (silver)
1986 – World Championships
1986 – Goodwill Games (bronze)
1987 – NORCECA (silver)
1988 – Summer Olympics
1990 – Goodwill Games
1990 – World Championships (bronze)
1991 – NORCECA (silver)
1991 – World Gala
1991 – World Cup
1992 – Summer Olympics (bronze)
1992 – FIVB Super Four (bronze)
1993 – NORCECA Championships (silver)
1993 – FIVB Grand Champions Cup
1995 – World Grand Prix (gold)
1995 – World Cup
1996 – Summer Olympics (7th place)

References
databaseOlympics
US Olympic Team
Profile

1965 births
Living people
American women's volleyball players
Arizona Wildcats women's volleyball players
Volleyball players at the 1988 Summer Olympics
Volleyball players at the 1992 Summer Olympics
Volleyball players at the 1996 Summer Olympics
Olympic bronze medalists for the United States in volleyball
Sportspeople from Quincy, Illinois
Medalists at the 1992 Summer Olympics
Competitors at the 1986 Goodwill Games
Competitors at the 1990 Goodwill Games
Pan American Games medalists in volleyball
Pan American Games bronze medalists for the United States
Medalists at the 1987 Pan American Games